New York Social Diary is a website that publishes photographs of "the rich and powerful" socialites and a social calendar of events that they might attend. It is maintained by David Patrick Columbia, who founded it in 2000.

History
The Diary originated in 1993 as a monthly column in Quest magazine. The column had a similar focus to the present website.

Influence
Chase Coleman III of old money and notoriously publicity-shy, has refused to be photographed for any publication since his 2005 wedding photographed by the New York Social Diary.

See also

 List of blogs

References

External links
 

2000 establishments in New York City
American blogs
Internet properties established in 2000
Socialites